The second millennium of the Anno Domini or Common Era was a millennium spanning the years 1001 to 2000 (11th to 20th centuries; in astronomy: JD  – ).

It encompassed the High and Late Middle Ages of the Old World, the Islamic Golden Age and the period of Renaissance, followed by the early modern period, characterized by the European wars of religion, the Age of Enlightenment, the Age of Discovery and the colonial period. Its final two centuries coincide with modern history, characterized by industrialization, the rise of nation states, the rapid development of science, widespread education, and universal health care and vaccinations in the developed world. The 20th century saw increasing globalization, most notably the two World Wars and the subsequent formation of the United Nations. 20th-century technology includes powered flight, television and semiconductor technology, including integrated circuits. The term "Great Divergence" was coined to refer the unprecedented cultural and political ascent of the Western world in the second half of the millennium, emerging by the 18th century as the most powerful and wealthy world civilization, having eclipsed Qing China, the Islamic world and India. This allowed the colonization by European countries of much of the world during this millennium, including the Americas, Africa, Oceania, and South and Southeast Asia.

World population grew without precedent over the millennium, from about 310 million in 1000 to about 6 billion in 2000. The population growth rate increased dramatically during this time; world population approximately doubled to 600 million by 1700, and doubled more than three more times by 2000, ultimately reaching about 1.8% per year in the second half of the 20th century.

Political history

Middle Ages

Europe
Western/Central Europe
Kingdom of Scotland (843–1707): see Medieval Scotland
 Kingdom of England (927–1707): see Medieval England
 Holy Roman Empire (962–1806): see Medieval Germany
 Kingdom of France (987–1789): see Medieval France
 Kingdom of Hungary (1000–1526)
 Kingdom of Poland (1025–1385): see Medieval Poland
 Old Swiss Confederacy (from c. 1300): see Medieval Switzerland
Medieval Italy
Kingdom of Italy
Papal States
Maritime republics
Kingdom of Sicily
Medieval Spain: see also Reconquista
 Caliphate of Córdoba (929–1031)
 Crown of Aragon (1035–1479)
 Crown of Castile (1030–1479)
 Emirate of Granada (1230–1492)
Medieval Scandinavia: see also Viking Age
 Kingdom of Denmark (c. 936–1397)
 Kingdom of Sweden (c. 970–1397)
 Kingdom of Norway (c. 1015–1397)
 Kalmar Union (1397–1523)
Eastern/Southeastern Europe
 Byzantine Empire (330–1453) 
 Kievan Rus (880–1150)
 Kingdom of Croatia (925–1102), Croatia in union with Hungary (1102–1526)
 Kingdom of Bosnia (1154–1463)
 Second Bulgarian Empire (1185–1396)
 Kingdom of Serbia (1217–1346)
 Serbian Empire (1346–1371)
 Grand Duchy of Lithuania (c. 1236–1795)
 Golden Horde (1240s–1502), see also: Tatar yoke
 Grand Duchy of Moscow (1283–1547)

Near East
 see also Crusades, Mongol invasions
 Byzantine Empire (330–1453)
 Abbasid Caliphate (750–1517) 
 Fatimid Caliphate (910–1171)
 Kingdom of Georgia (1008–1493)
 Seljuk Empire (1037–1194)
 Khwarazmian dynasty (1077–1231)
 Crusader states
County of Edessa (1098–1144)
Principality of Antioch (1098–1268)
Kingdom of Jerusalem (1099–1291)
County of Tripoli (1102–1289)
Latin Empire (1204–1261)
 Ayyubids (1171–1260)
 Sultanate of Rum (1194–1308)
 Mamluk Sultanate  (1250–1517)
 Ilkhanate (1256–1353)
 Ottoman Empire (1299–1924)
 Timurid Empire (1370–1507)

North Africa
 Almoravid dynasty (1040–1147)
 Almohad dynasty (1121–1269)
 Marinid dynasty (1244–1465)
 Hafsid dynasty (1229–1574)
 Kingdom of Tlemcen (1235–1554)

East Asia
 Goryeo (918–1392)
 Hoysala Empire (1026–1343)
 Jin dynasty (1115–1234)
 Joseon dynasty
 Khmer Empire (802–1431)
 Liao dynasty (907–1125)
 Mongol Empire (1206–1368)
 Ming dynasty (1368–1644)
 Pagan Kingdom (849–1287)
 Song dynasty (960–1279)
 Western Xia (1038–1227)
 Yuan (Mongol) dynasty (1271–1368)

India

Eastern Chalukyas (7th to 12th centuries)
Pala Empire (8th to 12th centuries)
Chola Empire (9th century to 13th centuries)
Western Chalukya Empire (10th to 12th centuries)
Kalachuri dynasty (10th to 12th centuries)
Eastern Ganga dynasty  (11th to 15th centuries)
Hoysala Empire (10th to 14th centuries)
Kakatiya Kingdom (1083–1323)
Sena dynasty (11th to 12th centuries)
Delhi Sultanate (1206–1526)
Bengal Sultanate (1352–1576)
Ahom Kingdom (from 1228)
Reddy Kingdom (1325–1448)
Seuna (Yadava) dynasty (1190–1315)
Vijayanagara Empire  (1375–1591)

Sahel / Sudan and Sub-Saharan Africa

 Gao Empire, Sahel (c. 9th to 15th centuries)
 Benin Empire, West Africa (from c. 1180)
 Sultanate of Ifat, Horn of Africa (1285–1415)

 Mali Empire, Sahel  (c. 1230–1600)
 Songhai Empire, Sahel  (c. 1464–1591)
 Empire of Kitara, East Africa (13th century)
 Oyo Empire, West Africa (from c. 1300)
 Kongo Empire, West Africa (from c. 1390)
 Kingdom of Nri, West Africa (from c. 1200?)

Pre-Columbian Americas
 Maya civilisation
 Toltec
 Mississippian culture
 Vinland
 Chimú
 Kingdom of Cuzco
 Aztec Empire 
 Inca Empire

Early Modern period

Europe

 Kingdom of Poland 
 Holy Roman Empire (see German Renaissance, early modern Germany )
 Kingdom of France, (see early modern France )
 Kingdom of England  (before 1707)
 Kingdom of Scotland  (before 1707)
 Kingdom of Great Britain (1707–1801)
 Habsburg Empire (1526–1867)

Colonial empires
 Spanish Empire (1402–1975)
 Portuguese Empire (1415–2002)
 Dutch Empire (1543–1975)
 British Empire (1583–1997)  
 French colonial empire (1605–1960)

Asia
 Ottoman Empire (1299–1922) 
 Safavid Persia 
 Zand dynasty (1750–1794)
 Qing Dynasty (1644–1912)
 Afsharid dynasty (1736–1796)
 Mughal Empire (1526–1858)
 Mysore empire (1399–1950)

Sub-Saharan Africa
 Mutapa Empire
 Maravi Empire
 Luba Empire
 Lunda Empire

Modern history

Europe
 French First Empire 
 British Empire (1583–1997)  
 Russian Empire (1721–1917)
 United Kingdom of Great Britain and Ireland (1801–1922)
 Austro-Hungarian Empire (1867–1918)
 Kingdom of Italy (1861–1946)
 French Second Empire (1852–1870)
 German Empire (1871–1918)
 French Third Republic (1870–1940)
 Nazi Germany (1933–1945)
 United Kingdom of Great Britain and Northern Ireland (since 1922)
 Soviet Union (1922–1991)

Asia
 Qing dynasty (1636–1912)
 Qajar dynasty (1794–1925)
 British Raj (1858–1947)
 Empire of Japan  (1868–1947)
 Republic of China (1912–1949)
 People's Republic of China (from 1949)
 Partition of India (1947)
Decline and modernization of the Ottoman Empire
Russian conquest of Central Asia 
First Philippine Republic (1898–1901)

Americas
 United States of America (from 1776)
 Mexican Empire (1821–1823)
 Empire of Brazil (1822–1889)
 Federal Republic of Central America (1823–1841)
 Gran Colombia (1819–1831)
 Canadian Confederation (1867)

Africa

European exploration of Africa
Scramble for Africa
French West Africa
French Equatorial Africa
French Algeria
German East Africa
Italian Libya
Portuguese Angola
Portuguese Mozambique
Spanish Sahara
Spanish protectorate in Morocco
Belgian Congo
Decolonisation
List of sovereign states and dependent territories in Africa

Cultural and technological history

Calendar

The Julian calendar was used in Europe at the beginning of the millennium, and all countries that once used the Julian calendar had adopted the Gregorian calendar by the end of it. For this reason, the end date of the 2nd millennium is usually calculated based on the Gregorian calendar, while the beginning date is based on the Julian calendar  (or occasionally the proleptic Gregorian calendar).

In the late 1990s, there was a dispute as to whether the millennium should be taken to end on December 31, 1999, or December 31, 2000.
Stephen Jay Gould at the time argued there is no objective way of deciding this question. 
Associated Press reported that the third millennium began on 1 January  2001, but also reported that celebrations in the US were generally more subdued at the beginning of 2001, compared to the beginning of 2000.
Many public celebrations for the end of the second millennium were held on December 31, 1999 – January 1, 2000—with a few people marking the end of the millennium a year later.

Centuries and decades

Notes

References

 
Millennia